Tigridia acesta, the tiger beauty, is a butterfly of the monotypic genus Tigridia in the family Nymphalidae found from Mexico to South America.

It is sometimes placed in the tribe Coeini and sometimes in the tribe Nymphalini.

Subspecies
 Tigridia acesta acesta (Linnaeus, 1758) (Mexico)
 Tigridia acesta columbina (Neustetter, 1929) (Colombia)
 Tigridia acesta fulvescens (Butler, 1873) (Peru, Ecuador)
 Tigridia acesta latifascia (Butler, 1873) (Colombia)
 Tigridia acesta ochracea (Bryk, 1953) (Peru)
 Tigridia acesta tapajona (Butler, 1873) (Brazil)

References

Coeini
Butterflies of Central America
Nymphalidae of South America
Lepidoptera of Brazil
Lepidoptera of Colombia
Lepidoptera of Ecuador
Butterflies of North America
Lepidoptera of Peru
Fauna of the Amazon
Butterflies described in 1758
Taxa named by Carl Linnaeus
Taxa named by Jacob Hübner